FatSecret is a mobile application, website and API that lets users track their nutrition, exercise and weight.

History 
FatSecret was founded in 2007 in Melbourne, Australia by Lenny Moses and Rodney Moses. As of 2019, Lenny serves as the company's CEO. The company is known for its calorie counting and meal tracking app, and by April 2016, the company claimed to have 45 million users of its services. In August 2018, a premium version of its app was released.

Since August 2009, the company has operated the FatSecret Platform API which allows access to its global food and nutrition database.

FatSecret reportedly had 900,000 downloads of its app in January 2020. In an analysis of several Health & Fitness app subcategories for the United States in January 2021, FatSecret was reported to have the highest 30 day user retention rate of top Calorie Counter + Meal Planner for Weight Loss apps.

See also
 Apple Health
 Google Fit
 Samsung Health
 Fitbit

References

External links 
 Official Website

Health software
Mobile applications
Activity trackers
Fitness apps